Ankatafa is a municipality in Madagascar. It belongs to the district of Ambanja, which is a part of Diana Region. According to 2001 census the population of Ankatafa was 8,652.

Ankatafa has a harbour, and primary and junior level secondary education are available in town. The majority 98% of the population are farmers.  The most important crop is coffee, while other important products are cocoa and rice.  Services provide employment for 2% of the population.

References and notes 

Populated places in Diana Region